Marketing Theory is a quarterly peer-reviewed academic journal covering the field of marketing. The editors-in-chief are Pauline Maclaran (Royal Holloway University of London) and Elizabeth Parsons (University of Liverpool). It was established in 2001 and is published by SAGE Publications.

Abstracting and indexing 
The journal is abstracted and indexed in Scopus and the Social Sciences Citation Index. According to the Journal Citation Reports, its 2021 impact factor is 3.476.

References

External links 
 

SAGE Publishing academic journals
English-language journals
Marketing journals
Publications established in 2001
Quarterly journals